George Cyril Brooke (18841934) was a British numismatist, specialising in the coins of England.

Career
Brooke was a member of the British Museum Dept of Coins and Medals from 1908 to 1934, on the council of the Royal Numismatic Society, and the author of numerous books and publications. He was awarded the Medal of the Royal Numismatic Society in 1934 (posthumously).

Publications
1912	The Edwinstowe find of Roman coins
1916	A Catalogue of English Coins in the British Museum: the Norman kings 
1966	English coins – from the seventh century to the present day

The Brooke Memorial
After Brooke’s death, a number of people interested in his work subscribed to purchase a coin - a gold noble of Edward IV, and the last coin Brooke handled before he died - to be donated in his memory to the British Museum.
 
Subscribers

 J. Allan
 F.W. Armitage
 Messrs A.H. Baldwin & Sons
 A.E. Ganall
 C.E. Blunt
 L. Cabot Briggs
 H.H. Brindley
 W.A. Brooke
 Frank E. Burton
 Major P.W.P. Carlyon-Britton
 V.B. Crowther-Beynon
 H.J. Dakers
 H. Daniels
 The Essay Club
 Sir Arthur Evans
 Lady Evans
 Miss Farquhar
 L. Forrer
 Messrs Glendining & Co
 Lord Grantley
 S.W. Grose
 G.C. Haines
 Christopher Hawkes
 Sir George Hill
 Norman Hill
 Horace H. King
 The Kent Numismatic Society
 Robert Kerr
 L.A. Lawrence
 E. Thurlow Leeds
 H.M. Lingford
 Dr A.H. Lloyd
 R. Cyril Lockett
 Prof T.O. Mabbott
 Sir George Macdonald
 H. Mattingly
 J. Mavrogordato
 J. Grafton Milne
 Ivo Pakenham
 Sir Charles Peers
 J.W.E. Pearce
 C.W. Phillips
 F.N. Pryce
 Prof E.J. Rapson
 E.S.G. Robinson
 Dr Kenneth Rogers
 V.J.E. Ryan
 F.S. Salisbury
 A.C. Savin
 B.A. Seaby
 J.S. Shirley-Fox (in memory of H.B. Earle-Fox)
 Messrs Spink & Son Ltd
 W.G. Smith
 H.W. Taffs
 A.B. Tonnochy
 Monsieur Victor Tourneur
 Monsieur A. Visart de Bocarme
 J. Walker
 Percy H. Webb
 Dr & Mrs Mortimer Wheeler
 R.B. Whitehead
 Miss M.E. Wood
 H. Nelson Wright

External links
G.C. Brooke on worldcat.org

References

British numismatists